Experto crede is a Latin motto which means Trust in one experienced; literally: "trust in the/an expert". It is usually used by an author as an aside to the reader, and may be loosely translated as: "trust me", "trust the expert", "believe one who has tried it", or "have faith in experience". When "crede" is followed by a personal name (e.g., crede John Smith), the expert in question is the name given.

In the variant form experto credite it is a quotation from the Aeneid by Virgil (Book XI, line 283).

Uses
It is the official motto of the US Air Force's 89th Airlift Wing, which flies Air Force One and transports other senior leaders of the US government
"Experto Crede" is the name of Adéwalé's ship in the Assassin's Creed Rogue [DLC Freedom Cry]

See also 
 List of Latin phrases
 Argument from authority

References

Latin mottos
Latin literary phrases
Latin words and phrases